Samvel Ter-Sahakyan (born 19 September 1993) is an Armenian chess grandmaster.

He won the 2003 Under 10 and 2009 Under 18 European Youth Chess Championship. He completed the Grandmaster requirements on 18 September 2008 during the European U16 championship, when his rating reached 2500, the title confirmed by FIDE in 2009. At the 2008 World U18 championship, Ter-Sahakyan scored 8 points of 11to finish fourth on tiebreak. He won the 2011 World U18 Chess Championship.

He was second in the 2011 Armenian Chess Championship, behind Robert Hovhannisyan. In 2012, he finished 3rd in the 74th Armenian championship with a score of 6/10 (+3 -1 = 6).

In 2015, Ter-Sahakyan won the Students section of the Moscow Open with 6/9, half a point ahead of Daniil Dubov and finished third on tiebreak with 7/9 at the Karen Asrian Memorial.

References

External links

Living people
1993 births
People from Vanadzor
Armenian chess players
Chess grandmasters
World Youth Chess Champions